The 1857 Wisconsin gubernatorial election was held on November 3, 1857. Republican Party candidate Alexander Randall won the election with just over 50% of the vote, defeating Democratic candidate James B. Cross.

Incumbent Governor Coles Bashford declined to seek re-election.

Democratic Party
James B. Cross was the incumbent Mayor of Milwaukee at the time of the 1857 gubernatorial election, serving his third consecutive term in that role.  He had also represented Milwaukee in the Wisconsin State Assembly for three terms.  Cross was a lawyer and had previously served as a probate judge in Milwaukee County.  He was a Wisconsin delegate to the 1856 Democratic National Convention.

James B. Cross was nominated on the third ballot at the Wisconsin Democratic Party Convention.  He received 89 votes; Jairus C. Fairchild received 37; Francis Huebschmann received 14.

Other candidates

 Jairus C. Fairchild, of Madison, had been the first State Treasurer of Wisconsin.  He was also the first Mayor of Madison after its incorporation as a city in 1856.
 Francis Huebschmann, of Milwaukee, was a physician and German American immigrant. He had served in the Wisconsin State Senate in the 1851 and 1852 sessions of the legislature, and was a member of the Milwaukee City Council and County Board.

Republican Party
Alexander W. Randall was a Wisconsin Circuit Court Judge in Milwaukee prior to the 1857 gubernatorial election, having been appointed by the previous Governor, Coles Bashford.  Randall had been an attorney for Governor Bashford in his challenge of the 1855 Wisconsin gubernatorial election results.  Earlier, in 1846, Randall had been a delegate to the first Wisconsin constitutional convention and had successfully advocated for including a provision by which African American suffrage could be legalized via referendum.  Randall served as a Democrat in the Wisconsin State Assembly in 1855, but became a Republican later that year when he ran unsuccessfully for election to be Attorney General of Wisconsin.

Randall became a compromise choice for gubernatorial nominee at the 1857 Wisconsin Republican Convention after delegates became deadlocked between the two leading candidates, Edward Holton and Walter McIndoe.

Other candidates

 Edward D. Holton, of Milwaukee, had previously been a candidate for Governor in the 1853 election, running on the Free Soil ticket.  Holton was a strident abolitionist and was well-connected to the Milwaukee elite as a businessman and banker.
 Walter D. McIndoe, of Wausau, had served three terms in the Wisconsin State Assembly representing the frontier northern counties of the state.  McIndoe was a Scottish immigrant and worked in the lumber industry.

Results

| colspan="6" style="text-align:center;background-color: #e9e9e9;"| General Election, November 3, 1857

References

1857
1857 Wisconsin elections
Wisconsin